S. P. Muthukumaran was an Indian politician and incumbent Member of the Tamil Nadu Legislative Assembly from the Pudukottai constituency. He represents the Communist Party of India party.

He died on 1 April 2012 as the result of a road accident.

References 

Communist Party of India politicians from Tamil Nadu
Year of birth missing
2012 deaths
Tamil Nadu MLAs 2011–2016